Louis James Nolan, Jr. (28 June 1926 Washington, D.C. – 24 October 2008 McLean, Virginia) was an American artist who, among other things, designed several United States Navy recruiting posters and, from 1985 through 2007, illustrated about twenty-five USPS stamps. In Navy literature, he is sometimes incorrectly credited as Lloyd Nolan. Nolan also created designs for NASA, the Smithsonian Institution, the other branches of the U.S. Armed Forces, and several federal agencies. His work was honored by the Art Directors Club of New York and Print magazine. He won gold and silver medals from the Art Directors Club of Metropolitan Washington.

Career 
Nolan graduated from St. John's College High School, Washington, D.C., in 1944. He went on to serve in the U.S. Navy from March 11, 1945, to March 31, 1946.

Nolan studied fine art at the Corcoran School of the Arts and Design in Washington, D.C., and graduated from New York's Parsons School of Design in 1952. He worked as a book designer and illustrator in New York, then returned to Washington to begin a freelance career. Nolan had been working for Creative Arts Studio, Inc., in Washington, D.C., when, in February 1964, in Georgetown, he and two other employees – Bill Duffy and Elmo James White, Jr. (1936–2020) – founded Nolan, Duffy & White, Inc. (ND&W), a commercial art firm. The Navy was the firm's primary client. Around 1971, the firm merged into the predecessor of White64 (E. James White Company → White+Partners, etc.), founded by White. After about ten years, Nolan and Duffy went out on their own. Nolan founded Nolan and Associates, Duffy became a freelance artist.

In the 1960s, Nolan illustrated for The National Guardsman, and, in January 1965, was credited as its Art Director.

Nolan retired in 1995. He died thirteen years later, October 24, 2008, at his home in McClean.

Selected work

Book, magazine, and pamphlet illustrations 

<ol type=square start="1">
 



 
 
<li> 

 

 
<ol type=square start="1">

 
<li> 
<li>

Posters

U.S. Navy recruiting posters 

<li> 
 RAD 67509
 RAD 74715

<li> 
 U.S. Government Printing Office 1975—652–505
 RAD 599–0546

<li> 

<li> 
 NRAF 21120

<li> 
 NRAF 64409
 NRAF 65411

<li> 
 RAD 66308
 RAD 67505

<li> 
 NRAF 41113

<li> 
 RAD 66307

<li> 
 NRAF 41129

<li> 
 NRAF 11113

<li> 
 

<li> 

<li> 

<li> 
 RAD 66511 – GPO 1966 O–796
 NRAF 47101

<li> 
 RAD 67502

<li>

U.S. Air Force recruiting poster 

<li>

NASA 

<li> 
 

<li>

United States Postage Stamps 
Nolan designed many stamp products for the U.S. Postal Service® and more than a dozen stamps, including the first five in the American Design series that began in 2002. Some of these stamps have been reprinted in recent years, including:

 
<li> 
 1985 → Scott No. 2123.

<li> 
 1986 → Scott No. USA 2135.
 1986 → Scott No. USA 2135A (imperfect).

<li> 
 1987 → Scott No. USA 2253.

<li> 
 1988 → Scott No. USA 2254.

<li> 
 1988 → Scott No. USA 2261.
 1988 → Scott No. USA 2261A (imperfect).

 
<li> 22¢ postage stamp: "CPA."
 1987 → Scott No. USA 2361.

 
<li> 14¢ stamped postcard: Depicting a Western Mountain Scene (1987)

 
<li> 
 Lettering and calligraphy by Julian Waters.
 1989 → Scott No. 2421.

 
<li> 
 1992 → Scott No. USA 2593.
 1992 → Scott No. USA 2593A.
 1993 → Scott No. USA 2594 (re-issue with a red "USA").

 
 Lou Nolan and Richard W. Schlecht (born 1936), designers
<li> 
 1993 → Scott No. USA 2781.
<li> 
 1993 → Scott No. USA 2779.
<li> 
 1993 → Scott No. USA 2780.
<li> 
 90¢ George Washington (1860; Scott USA 39)
 2¢ Empire State Express (1901; Scott USA 295)
 24¢ Inverted Jenny (1918; Scott C3a)
<li> 65¢ Graf Zeppelin over the Atlantic (1930; Scott C13)

 1993 → Scott No. USA 2782.

 
<li> 
 1992 → Scott No. USA 2718A.
<li> 29¢ postage stamp: "Toy Horse Booklet Single."
 1992 → Scott No. USA 2711.
 1992 → Scott No. USA 2715.
<li> 
 1992 → Scott No. USA 2712.
 1992 → Scott No. USA 2719.
<li> 
 1992 → Scott No. USA 2713.
 1992 → Scott No. USA 2716.
<li> 
 1992 → Scott No. USA 2714.
 1992 → Scott No. USA 2718.
<li> 
 1994 → Scott No. USA 2872.

 
<li> 

 
 
<li> 
 2002 → Scott No. USA 3612.
 2004 → Scott No. USA 3756.

<li> 
 2002
 2003 → Scott No. USA 3757.
 2006 → Scott No. USA 3762.
 2008 → Scott No. USA 3763.
 2008 → Scott No. USA 3763A (untagged).
 
<li> 
 2004 → Scott No. USA 3755.
 2007 → Scott No. USA 3761.
 2013
 2014 → Scott No. USA 3761A.

<li> 
 2003 → Scott No. USA 3758.
 2007 → Scott No. USA 3749.
 2007 → Scott No. USA 3757.
 2008 → Scott No. USA 3749A.
 2008 → Scott No. USA 3758A.

<li> 
 2004 → Scott No. USA 3719.
 2004 → Scott No. USA 3750.
 2006 → Scott No. USA 3751.
 2006 → Scott No. USA 3752.
 2007 → Scott No. USA 3753.
 2011 → Scott No. USA 3758B.

 BEP = U.S. Bureau of Engraving and Printing

Undesignated art 
 "Untitled". Artist: Lou Nolan. US Air Force Art Collection. January 1, 1995.
 "SAC". Artist: Lou Nolan – depicting a Boeing B-47 Stratojet in flight.

Family 
Nolan was born to the marriage of Louis James Nolan (1905–1976) and Mary J. White (born 1905). He married twice, first – on June 3, 1950, at Calvary Baptist Church in Washington, D.C. – to Emilie Jean Edwards (1926–2017); then – around 1985 – to Sara Louise Danis (1940–2001), a graphic designer.

Affiliations 
In 1963, Nolan was elected to the board of directors of the Bethesda-Chevy Chase Chapter of the Izaak Walton League.

Bibliography

Annotations

Notes

References 

 

 .
  .
  ;  (digital); ;  (hardcover); .

 

 
Incorporated February 16, 1965 → Dissolved December 30, 1971, after merger → Jurisdiction: Washington, D.C. → DCRA File No. 650258

 

  ; ; ; ; ;   (ProQuest Research Library database).
 

  ; ; .

  .
  ; .

  ; .
<li> 

<li> 

<li> 

<li> 

<li> 

<li> 
<li> 

 Nazar, Richard Joseph (born 1963) (ed.); 
 
  .
  ; .

 
Incorporated February 16, 1965 – Dissolved December 30, 1971, after merger → Jurisdiction: Washington, D.C. → Extuid 2723009 → DCRA File No. 650258

 
 
 
 
 
 
 
 
 
 
 
 
 
<li> 

 USS Savo Island Picture Book; Anderson, William Donald, Captain (1901–1987), Commanding (authorized by); Benton, Brantford B., Lieutenant USNR (Brantford Walsh Benton; 1908–1984) (ed.).  ; ; ; .

 
 

 

  ; ; .
  ; ; .

   (ProQuest Research Library database).

  ;  (article) (U.S. Newsstream database → also ).

 . ;  (article) (U.S. Newsstream database).
  .
  .
  ;  (article) (U.S. Newsstream database).
  ;  (article) (U.S. Newsstream database).
  ;  (article) (U.S. Newsstream database).
  ;  (article) (U.S. Newsstream database).
  .

 
<li>

<li>

<li>

<li>

<li>

<li>

<li>

<li>

<li>

<li>

  ; .
  – via  → Image 509.
 
 
   (1955–1956 ed.);  (1965 ed.; Baltimore, Genealogical Publishing Company);  (2008 re-print of 1955 ed.);  (2008 re-print of 1955 ed.); ;  (Vol. 2).

  Retrieved July 22, 2021 – via USPS and US Postal Bulletins Consortium (search link). ; ; .
<li> 

<li> 

<li> 

<li> 

<li> 

<li> 

<li> 

<li> 

<li> 

<li> 

<li> 

<li> 

<li> 

<li> 

<li> 

<li> 

<li> 

<li> 

<li> 

<li> 

<li> 

<li> 

<li> 

<li> 

<li> 

<li> 

<li> 

<li> 

<li> 

<li> 

<li>

External links 

Postage stamps
1926 births
2008 deaths
People from Washington, D.C.
People from McLean, Virginia
Corcoran School of the Arts and Design alumni
Parsons School of Design alumni
Space artists
20th-century American painters
21st-century American painters
American graphic designers
American male painters
American watercolorists
American poster artists
20th-century male artists
21st-century male artists
American illustrators
American stamp designers
Philately of the United States
United States Navy personnel of World War II
United States Navy sailors
American advertising people
American war artists